James Barbour (18345 May 1912) was a Scottish architect responsible for over four hundred buildings in Dumfriesshire and Kirkcudbrightshire. His twin brother Robert set up the drapers shop in Dumfries which went on to become the business R Barbour & Sons.

James Barbour was born in Dunscore and began his training in Dumfries in -1849 with Walter Newall. He set up his own practice in 1860.

He was a member of the Dumfriesshire and Galloway Natural History and Antiquarian Society and Fellow of the Society of Antiquaries of Scotland. He excavated the Roman site at Birrens.

References 

1834 births
1912 deaths
19th-century Scottish architects
People from Dumfries and Galloway